Welchs Creek is an unincorporated community in Butler County, Kentucky, United States. Welchs Creek had a post office until July 2, 1994.

Likely named for Christopher Evans and Mary Lewis, Welsh immigrants who settled on the creek in the 1780s.

References

Unincorporated communities in Butler County, Kentucky
Unincorporated communities in Kentucky